Ismaïla Manga (August 8, 1957 – March 13, 2015) was a Senegalese Jola painter.

Born in Kamoya, he studied at the Senegal's national fine arts academy between 1977 and 1982. He lived for 13 years in Montreal (Quebec).

He lived in the Village des Arts de Dakar until he died on March 13, 2015.  He had a son, Wesley (aka. Lamin) Manga.

Bibliography
 « Ismaïla Manga au village des arts, carnet de voyage du peintre venu de Kamoya », article de Jean Pires dans Le Soleil, 13

References

External links
 À la rencontre des artistes contemporains du Mali, du Burkina Faso et du Sénégal (Mémoire d’Esthétique et sciences de l’art de Marion Brousse, Université de Paris, octobre 2002, interview p. 73-76)
 Fiche sur le site de l'Artothèque de Montréal
 Fiche sur Typic' Arts Gallery

1957 births
Senegalese painters
2015 deaths
20th-century painters
21st-century painters
Male painters